Doubutsu Sentai Zyuohger is a 2016 Japanese television series, and is the 40th entry of the long-running Super Sentai series produced by Toei Company. The series follows the battles of the Zyuohgers, a team composed of two humans and five members of the anthropomorphic animal race known as Zyumans who protect the Earth from the evil invading alien outlaws known as Dethgalien who choose the planet as their newest hunting ground.

Episodes

Notes

References

External links
 for TV Asahi
 for Toei Company

Doubutsu Sentai Zyuohger